Denise Margaret Scott (born 24 April 1955) is an Australian stand-up comedian, actor, television and radio presenter.

Career
Scott has appeared frequently on Australian television since her regular slot on ABC TV's The Big Gig in 1990, and a weekly segment on Tonight Live with Steve Vizard. Scott was one of the most frequent guests on musical quiz show Spicks and Specks, and appeared several times on The Glass House and Good News Week.

In 1993 she performed the live show, Women Stand Up! with Sue Ingleton and Lynda Gibson. She also co-starred with Judith Lucy and Lynda Gibson in stage spectaculars Comedy Is Not Pretty (1999) and Comedy Is Still Not Pretty (2003).

She was a member of the Vega 91.5 FM breakfast radio show; Dave and Denise with Shaun Micallef (formerly called Shaun, Beverley and Denise), until she finished up with Vega on 23 November 2007.

Scott has made appearances on Network 10 shows Can of Worms, The Circle, The Project, All Star Family Feud, Would I Lie to You?, Have You Been Paying Attention? and Hughesy, We Have a Problem.

Scott starred as Trish Gross in the Australian drama series Winners & Losers on the Seven Network. She appeared as a guest on the talk show Can of Worms on Network Ten on Monday 29 August. Scott also appeared on Channel 31's To Hell in a Handbasket, with Dolly Diamond on Tuesday 17 December 2013.

Scott stars as Gwen in the Australian ABC comedy series It's a Date.

In 2017, Scott started narrating the Australian travel series Travel Guides on the Nine Network, and again teamed up with Judith Lucy for a new live show, Disappointments which commenced touring and was performed in Melbourne in April 2017 as part of the International Comedy Festival.

In April 2018, Network Ten announced Scott would join Studio 10 as a panelist.

In 2019, Scott competed in the sixteenth season of Dancing with the Stars, where she was paired up with Jeremy Garner. She was second to be eliminated from the competition.

In July 2019, Scott announced her resignation as a panelist on Studio 10.

Personal life
Scott grew up in Greensborough, Victoria.  She lives with her partner John, whom she met whilst in a clowning ensemble in Albury-Wodonga. She has two children, musician Jordie Lane and multidisciplinary artist Bonnie Lane.

References

External links
 

1955 births
Australian radio personalities
Australian women radio presenters
Australian stand-up comedians
Helpmann Award winners
Living people
Comedians from Melbourne
Australian women comedians
Radio personalities from Melbourne
People from Greensborough, Victoria